Willie Klutse is a former Ghanaian international football player. He was in the Ghana squad that won the 1978 African Cup of Nations held in Ghana, and scored in the match against Nigeria. He was also selected for the Ghana squad that faced Guinea in the 1978 FIFA World Cup qualifying rounds, but did not appear in the match.

Honours
1978 African Cup of Nations - champions

References

Ghanaian footballers
Ghana international footballers
1978 African Cup of Nations players
1980 African Cup of Nations players
Africa Cup of Nations-winning players
Living people
Association footballers not categorized by position
Year of birth missing (living people)